Aquimarina sediminis  is a Gram-negative, strictly aerobic, rod-shaped and motile bacterium from the genus of Aquimarina which has been isolated from marine sediments.

References 

Flavobacteria
Bacteria described in 2020